Microd (short for Micro Hot Rod) racing is a form of youth automobile racing unique to Central New York state. Drivers race on a 1/10 mile dirt or paved oval track. Traditional wood-frame microds were homemade vehicles built of common materials such as plywood. Microd clubs may also race metal-frame classes which use quarter midget cars (making the length of the track the primary difference between microd racing and Quarter Midget racing). New York State Microd Association (NYSMA) and the Tri County Microd Club (TCMC) are the only governing body's for this sport.

Cars
There are three divisions of microd racing: traditional wood-frame microds, steel frame microds, and open wheel microds (quarter midgets). The cars in all divisions are powered by a 3 to 6 horsepower lawnmower engine with a single gearing driving the left rear wheel by a chain, or both rear wheels by the use of a live axle.  Families often build the cars themselves in accordance with the construction specifications provided in the NYSMA plan book.

History
The sport originated in Skaneateles, NY in 1954 when Edwin Robinson Sr. and his son Edwin (Bob) Robinson Jr. designed the original wood-frame microd. After local children began driving the cars around the village streets, the village approached the Robinsons to develop the first microd track. The original clay track was located on the grounds of the current Allyn Arena.

NASCAR driver Doug Heveron began his racing career at the Syracuse-Geddes MicRod Track at the age of 8.

References

Motorsport in New York (state)
Racing car classes
Auto racing by type
The history of microd Racing / Little Wheels